This is a list of the cattle breeds usually considered to have originated in Portugal.

References 

 *